The Honanki Heritage Site is a cliff dwelling and rock art site located in the Coconino National Forest, about  west of Sedona, Arizona. The Palatki Heritage Site is nearby, also in the Coconino National Forest.

History

Ancient peoples
The Honanki and Palatki archaeological sites were first studied by Jesse Walter Fewkes of the Smithsonian Institution. He conducted test excavations at both sites in 1895 and in 1911, during his study of Hopi migration traditions. Fewkes named the site "Honanki," which means "Bear House" in the Hopi language. Honanki was one of the largest prehistoric pueblos in the Verde Valley. This period in Southern Sinagua prehistory is called the "Honanki Phase." Many of the cliff dwellings in the area west of Sedona were occupied during the Honanki Phase. The Sinagua occupation of Honanki was probably between 1130 and 1280 CE, based on a tree-ring date of 1271 (from a wooden beam in the ruin) and other archaeological evidence.

The rooms at the east end of Honanki were all destroyed in a large fire. Fire-marked stones were then reused to build new rooms. There were at least three phases of construction in the Honanki alcove.

Pictographs are a key feature of the site. Some of them were present before the caves were inhabited, dating to 2000 BCE. However, most of the pictographs are additions from the Sinagua peoples dating between 900 and 1300 CE.

Historic peoples
Honanki was later inhabited by both Yavapai and Apache people. Pictographs dating between 1400 and 1875 CE can be attributed to these two groups.

See also
 Palatki Heritage Site
 Red Rock-Secret Mountain Wilderness

References

External links

 Honanki Heritage Site at Coconino National Forest. Includes directions to the site.
 Honanki Ruins photo gallery by Coconino National Forest
 Honanki Ruins at Hike Arizona
 Rock art at Honanki, photo gallery

Parks in Yavapai County, Arizona
Archaeological sites in Arizona
Petroglyphs in Arizona
Ancient Puebloan archaeological sites in Arizona
Buildings and structures in Yavapai County, Arizona
12th century in North America
Native American history of Arizona
Coconino National Forest
Sinagua